Jang Mond (born 13 December 1952) is a retired Luxembourgian football defender.

References

1952 births
Living people
Luxembourgian footballers
Jeunesse Esch players
FC Avenir Beggen players
Association football defenders
Luxembourg international footballers